The Blackpool Gazette (locally marketed as simply The Gazette) is an English daily newspaper based in Blackpool, Lancashire. Published every day except Sunday, it covers the towns and communities of the Fylde coast. It was founded as The West Lancashire Evening Gazette in 1929 before being renamed the Evening Gazette, and then Blackpool Gazette. The paper's history dates back to a weekly publication  founded in 1873.

Background
The newspaper is published by JPI Media (owned by National World), and is known locally as The Gazette. The editor is Nicola Adam. Two other weekly newspapers are also published – the Lytham St.Annes Express and the Fleetwood Weekly News. It is online at blackpoolgazette.co.uk.

The Gazette had a close link with local football club Blackpool until the club's relegation from the Premier League in 2011. In 2014, the newspaper decided to scrap club chairman Karl Oyston's weekly column "given such disgusting and offensive comments" he made to a Blackpool fan. Oyston's response was to stop recognising The Gazette as local media, instead only allowing them to attend national news conferences. The Oystons left the club in 2019.

References

External links
Blackpool Gazette Website
 Lytham St.Annes Express online
 Fleetwood Weekly News online
 Witryana Polska - Polish Gazette

Mass media in Blackpool
Newspapers published in Lancashire
Publications established in 1873
1873 establishments in England
Daily newspapers published in the United Kingdom
Newspapers published by Johnston Press